David McGrath (20 November 1875 – 20 May 1940) was an Irish hurler who played for Cork Senior Championship club Redmonds. He was a member of the Cork senior hurling team for seven season, during which time he usually lined out as a forward.

Honours

Redmonds
Cork Senior Hurling Championship: 1900, 1901

Cork
All-Ireland Senior Hurling Championship: 1902, 1903
Munster Senior Hurling Championship: 1901, 1902, 1903, 1904, 1905

Sources
 Corry, Eoghan, The GAA Book of Lists (Hodder Headline Ireland, 2005).
 Cronin, Jim, A Rebel Hundred: Cork's 100 All-Ireland Titles.
 Donegan, Des, The Complete Handbook of Gaelic Games (DBA Publications Limited, 2005).

References

1875 births
1940 deaths
Redmond's hurlers
Cork inter-county hurlers
All-Ireland Senior Hurling Championship winners